Adam Holroyd (born 5 September 2004) is a professional rugby league footballer who plays as a  forward for the Warrington Wolves in the Betfred Super League.

In 2022 Holroyd made his début for Warrington in the Super League against the Leeds Rhinos.

References

External links
Warrington Wolves profile

2004 births
Living people
Rugby league second-rows
Warrington Wolves players